The Michael Fowler Centre is a concert hall and convention centre in Wellington, New Zealand. It was constructed on reclaimed land next to Civic Square, and is the pre-eminent concert site in central Wellington.

Commissioned in 1975, building began in 1980; the centre officially opened on 16 September 1983. It was designed by Miles Warren and Maurice Mahoney of Warren and Mahoney, with acoustic assistance from Professor A. Harold Marshall, formerly the Head of Auckland University's Acoustics Research Centre. It is named after the primary promoter of its construction, Sir Michael Fowler, at the time the mayor of Wellington. The auditorium seats 2210 people during a concert, and 1035 during a classroom type event.

Events and performances 

The centre is used by international and local acts, conferences, and summits; it is also the home of the New Zealand Symphony Orchestra, Orchestra Wellington, and Arise Church.

The venue is now part of the Venues Wellington group of venues, managed by the Wellington Regional Economic Development Agency.

Exterior lighting 
The exterior of the Michael Fowler Centre contains a lighting system which allows light to be reflected off the concrete panels of the building. These lights have been used to mark significant occasions such as local LGBT Pride events, one hundred and twenty five years of women's suffrage in New Zealand, the birth of Prince George of Cambridge,  or in memory of the victims of the November 2015 Paris attacks.

See also
 List of concert halls

References

External links
 
 

Convention centres in New Zealand
Concert halls in New Zealand
Buildings and structures in Wellington City
Tourist attractions in Wellington City
1980s architecture in New Zealand
Brutalist architecture in New Zealand
Wellington Central, Wellington